Abhijan is a 1984 Bangladeshi film starring Ilias Kanchan and Anjana Sultana opposite him. Mahfuzur Rahman Khan bagged Bangladesh National Film Awards for Best Cinematographer. It is directed by Razzak and also stars Razzak, Jashim and Rozina.

Synopsis 
Raju, Rauf and Ratan are three friends. The three of them started a new business together. They get a contract from Rahman to supply materials for his construction site. While traveling by river they rescue Kusum from the river. All three find a girl alone in their boat and try to seduce her. On the other hand, Rahman's old business enemy Sharif attacks them so that they cannot carry their goods properly. They are determined to deal with these and complete their work on time.

Cast 
 Ilias Kanchan
 Anjana Sultana
 Jashim
 Razzak
 Rozina

Music
The film's music was composed by Anwar Parvez with lyrics by Gazi Mazharul Anwar.

"Hat Dhore Niye Cholo" - Andrew Kishore, Sabina Yasmin

Awards 
Bangladesh National Film Awards
Best Cinematographer – Mahfuzur Rahman Khan

References

1984 films
Bengali-language Bangladeshi films
Films scored by Anwar Pervez (musician)
1980s Bengali-language films